Pellenes seriatus is a species of 'jumping spiders' belonging to the family Salticidae.

 This species is mainly present in most of Europe.

The males of this species frontally look very similar to Pellenes lapponicus and to Hasarius adansoni. In males the basic color of the hairy body is black, with a white longitudinal stripe on the middle of the opistosoma and a bright red mask on the eyes. The color of the opistosoma may be black or dark brownish. The pedipalps have whitish tips, while the legs are wholly black. In the females the red mask is missing. These spiders have eight eyes with very large anterior median eyes and smaller on each side. Their eyesight is excellent.

References
 Jerzy Proszynski 2005 - Pellenes seriatus
 Platnick, Norman I. (2009): The world spider catalog, version 9.5. American Museum of Natural History
 Cantarella T., P. Alicata, 2002. On the genus Pellenes Simon 1876 (Araneae, Salticidae): synonymies and description of a new Italian species. Boll. Accad. Gioenia Sci. Nat. Catania, 35, 361: 577-579, figs 8-11.

External links
 Fauna Europaea
 Salticidae
 PBI

Salticidae
Spiders of Europe
Spiders described in 1875